The 2016 Davis Cup World Group Play-offs were held from 16 to 18 September. They were the main play-offs of the 2016 Davis Cup. The winners of the playoffs advanced to the 2017 Davis Cup World Group, and the losers were relegated to their respective Zonal Regions I.

Teams
Bold indicates team had qualified for the 2017 Davis Cup World Group.

From World Group
 
 
 
 
 
 
 
 

 From Americas Group I

 
 

 From Asia/Oceania Group I

 
 

 From Europe/Africa Group I

Results summary
Date: 16–18 September

The eight losing teams in the World Group first round ties and eight winners of the Zonal Group I final round ties competed in the World Group Play-offs for spots in the 2017 World Group.  The draw took place on July 18 in London.

Seeded teams

 
 
 
 
 
 
 
 

Unseeded teams

 
 
 
 
 
 
 
 

Playoff results

Uzbekistan vs. Switzerland

Belgium vs. Brazil

Australia vs. Slovakia

Canada vs. Chile

Russia vs. Kazakhstan

Friday games were moved to Saturday due to rain. The fifth set of the 2nd game was moved from Saturday to Sunday due to dark.

India vs. Spain

Germany vs. Poland

Japan vs. Ukraine

References

World Group Play-offs